Alfred Clark Chapin (March 8, 1848 – October 2, 1936) was an American lawyer and politician who served as the Mayor of Brooklyn and for one year as a member of the United States House of Representatives from 1891 to 1892.

Early life
Chapin was born to Ephraim Atlas Chapin who had interests in the railroad and Josephine, née Clark. He had a younger sister Alice Chapin who was an actress and suffragette.

He attended the public and private schools and graduated from Williams College (in Williamstown, Massachusetts) in 1869, and from Harvard Law School in 1871. He was admitted to the bar in 1872 and commenced practice in New York City with residence in Brooklyn.

Political career
He was a member of the New York State Assembly (Kings Co., 11th D.) in 1882 and 1883, and was Speaker in 1883. On January 13, 1882, he was injured in the same train accident in which State Senator Webster Wagner was killed.

He was New York State Comptroller from 1884 to 1887, elected at the New York state election, 1883 and the New York state election, 1885.

He was Mayor of Brooklyn from 1888 to 1891.

Tenure in Congress 
Chapin was elected as a Democrat to the 52nd United States Congress to fill the vacancy caused by the resignation of David A. Boody and served from November 3, 1891, to November 16, 1892, when he resigned.

Later life
Chapin served as railroad commissioner of New York State from 1892 to 1897, and continued the practice of law, He was also financially interested in various enterprises. He also owned a summer home in Murray Bay, Quebec.

Personal life
On February 20, 1884, Chapin was married to Grace Stebbins (1860–1908). She was the daughter of Alice Holmes Schieffelin (1838–1913) and Russell Stebbins (1835–1894) and the granddaughter of Samuel Schieffelin, a religious author and businessman. Together, they were the parents of:

 Grace Chapin (1885–1960), who married Hamilton Fish III (1888–1991), a member of the U.S. House of Representatives.
 Beatrice Chapin (1889–1932)

After his first wife's death in 1908, he remarried to Charlotte (née Storrs) Montant (1860–1942), the widow of Charles Montant, on January 6, 1913.

Chapin died in the Ritz-Carlton Hotel while on a visit in Montreal, Quebec, Canada in 1936.  He was buried at Woodlawn Cemetery, Bronx.  Chapin's grandson Hamilton Fish IV also was a U.S. Representative from New York.

References

External links
 
 Political Graveyard
 
 

1848 births
1936 deaths
People from South Hadley, Massachusetts
Democratic Party members of the United States House of Representatives from New York (state)
Speakers of the New York State Assembly
New York State Comptrollers
Mayors of Brooklyn
Williams College alumni
Harvard Law School alumni
Burials at Woodlawn Cemetery (Bronx, New York)